Abhavanan is an Indian screenwriter, Associate Music Director, Lyricist, Director and Producer of Tamil films.

Overview 

Abhavanan is a portmanteau of his parents' names Arumugam and Pavayee. Since the early 1980s, he worked in Tamil films. He spent most of his career screenwriting, lyrics writing, music composing and producing movies with different themes. He is the first person in Tamil cinema, who introduced live recording in sound effects, he is also the first person to introduce DTS sound system in India. He is well known for his screenplay and also for his interval block in "Inaintha kaigal." He studied in MGR Government Film & Television Institute.

He is a very successful director and it is to be noted that he has not worked as Assistant Director in any other films. He has to his credits of introducing many new faces and talents in the film industry. He introduced Music Director Manoj- Gyan (Manoj Patnakhar -Gyan Varma). He has also introduced Singer Hariharan in Tamil film Industry.

In regards with technology of film & serial making, he is the first one to introduce DTS Sound System in India / South East Asia.

As a Film Maker 

Most of his films became sensational commercial success in collection, at the same time created a new format in the Indian cinema and film techniques.
All his action sequences in his films were unique. All those action sequences were giving new dimensions not only to the audience but also to the film technicians. Some sequences like bullock cart races in Uzhavan Magan, train sequences in Sendhoora Poovae, interval block and jail break sequences in Enaindha Kaigal are very popular.
Some of his films are used as theories to the film technology students.

Lyricist and Music Director 

As a lyrics writer and as a music composer, he has created a separate wave in 80s. Especially as a music composer he was very popular for his music re-recording in all his films. That was appreciated by all the top musicians throughout India.
One of his popular songs, 'Tholvi nilaiyena ninaithal' from "Oomai Vizhigal" is treated like an anthem to the Tamilians throughout the world.
As a singer he has sung only 5 songs (one song for out side music director). All are worldwide super hits.
Among them "Varan Varan Poochandi" became very popular in all schools, and colleges as their function celebration song.

Trends in Indian Cinema 

Cinemascope format in Indian Cinema became popular through his films only.
The Trend which he started in his films, slowly became the Trend of Indian Cinema.
Till 90s, making a stereo sound film was a very rare occasion. Those times, making a film with Stereo phonic sound was a dream to every Film maker.

That dream of all Indian film makers, became true when he introduced the DTS sound system in his film, " Karuppu Roja" in India for the first time. For this Tamil Film release, not only in India, but also in Singapore, Malaysia, Canada, London, Germany and Switzerland all over the world as the first time, all those releasing theatres, converted into DTS sound system. Those were the historical moments.

Till late 80s, in over seas, films were getting released only in the video formats. After a period of 100 days or 175 days of the general release of that movie in the theatres in India they will release in over seas. That entire system was changed by him during his film "Enaindha Kaigal" release. Along with Ingharan International Karuna moorthy, this was planned. In the year 1990  August 2 "Enaindha Kaigal" during its general release in India, it was released throughout the World simultaneously in the same day. From that day onwards, all the  Indian films simultaneously started getting released in the theatres. That trend started.

Channel and TRP Strategy 

There was a period, that only one channel Sun TV was ruling the Tamil people with their viewership. No satellite channel could match their viewership. Other channels can enter in ratings only after the 100th program of Sun TV.  Then Abhavanan entered with mega plan, by making a mega serial for Raj TV. In those days it was told by others, that this is almost like suicide. The mega serial "Ganga Yamuna Saraswati" started in Raj TV in the 1998 January. Within two months period the miracle happened, history changed. Raj TV became no 1 channel in Viewership. Entire Indian satellite world stunned by seeing that success. Abhavanan made that miracle with one program. "Ganga Yamuna Saraswati" mega serial is the one of the biggest success in Tamil and also the first one which created a new trend in the history of south Indian satellite media.

Cinema and small screen career 

He also changed the TV Serial format and gave a big success in small screen through the title GANGA YAMUNA SARASWATHI.

Personal life 

Abhavanan was born to Arumugam and Pavayee.

Filmography 
Oomai Vizhigal (1986)
Uzhavan Magan (1987)
Senthoora Poove (1988)
Inaindha Kaigal (1990)
Annan Ennada Thambi Ennada (1992) (co-music)
Kaviya Thalaivan (1992)
Mutrugai (1993)
Karuppu Roja (1995)
Lyrics
All songs (Oomai Vizhigal)
All songs (Uzhavan Magan)
Varapu Thalaiyane, Muthu Mani Pallakku, Aathukulle Yelelo (Senthoora Poove)
All songs (Inaintha Kaigal)
All songs (Annan Ennada Thambi Ennada)
All songs (Kaaviya Thalaivan)
All songs (Mutrugai)
All songs (Karuppu Roja)

References

Tamil film directors
Living people
20th-century Indian film directors
Year of birth missing (living people)